Okawville is a village in Washington County, Illinois, United States. The population was 1,434 at the 2010 census.

History
Okawville was originally known simply as "Okaw," from an early name of the Kaskaskia River that derived from the Mississippi Valley French au Kaskaskies ("to the Kaskaskias").  The post office was known as Okaw from its establishment in 1836 until 1872, when the name was changed to Okawville.

In the late 19th and early 20th century Okawville was a prominent spa community. The first Okawville Springs Hotel was established in 1867.

Geography
Okawville is located at  (38.432589, -89.548358).

Demographics

As of the census of 2000, there were 1,355 people, 569 households, and 372 families residing in the village. The racial makeup of the village was 98.23% White, 0.37% African American, 0.52% Native American, 0.15% Asian, 0.22% from other races, and 0.52% from two or more races. Hispanic or Latino of any race were 0.37% of the population.

There were 569 households, out of which 29.5% had children under the age of 18 living with them, 55.9% were married couples living together, 6.5% had a female householder with no husband present, and 34.6% were non-families. 30.4% of all households were made up of individuals, and 16.9% had someone living alone who was 65 years of age or older. The average household size was 2.38 and the average family size was 2.98.

In the village, the population was spread out, with 24.8% under the age of 18, 7.2% from 18 to 24, 28.1% from 25 to 44, 22.2% from 45 to 64, and 17.6% who were 65 years of age or older. The median age was 38 years. For every 100 females, there were 97.5 males. For every 100 females age 18 and over, there were 93.4 males.

The median income for a household in the village was $37,448, and the median income for a family was $50,089. Males had a median income of $32,226 versus $22,813 for females. The per capita income for the village was $19,476. About 3.6% of families and 6.5% of the population were below the poverty line, including 5.6% of those under age 18 and 9.3% of those age 65 or over.

Schools
Okawville is home to an old grade school, Immanuel Lutheran School, Okawville Grade School, and Okawville High School.

Attractions
Okawville features Roland Barkau Memorial Golf Course, The American Legion Post 233, Rainbow Ranch, The Steam Pipe, and Heritage House Historic Sites and Museum.The Original Springs Mineral Spa and Hotel, established in 1867, features a spring-fed spa with waters containing minerals such as calcium, magnesium, potassium, zinc, iodine, iron, and sulfur.

References

External links
Village of Okawville Chamber of Commerce web page
Village of Okawville web page

Villages in Washington County, Illinois
Villages in Illinois